"Love Don't Die" is a song recorded by American pop-rock band the Fray. It was released on December 12, 2013, as the first single from their fourth album Helios. The band premiered the song while performing in various concerts in the United States during October 2013. The song was released for airplay on October 15, 2013, and was released for download in the United States on iTunes on October 21, 2013. The song is used in a commercial for the Samsung Gear Fit and commercial for CSI:Las Vegas S15 (only available in AXN Asia).

Music video 
The music video for the single was released on December 6, 2013. It features the guest star Candice King from The Vampire Diaries, who is also Joe King's real life wife, and holds its setting at a bar. In the video, a stranger begins to harass Candice, so guitarist Joe King initiates a fight. The fight progresses and comes to include the entire band, and ends when the band escapes the bar on motorcycles. The video is heavily inspired by a scene from The Blues Brothers in which similar proceedings in bar take place.

Live performances
"Love Don't Die" was performed on October 22, 2013, on NBC's Today Show.

Chart performance

Weekly charts

Year-end charts

Certifications

References

External links

 Official website
 Official UK website

2013 singles
The Fray songs
Epic Records singles
Songs written by Isaac Slade
Songs written by Ryan Tedder
Song recordings produced by Stuart Price